The Aer Lualdi L.59 was an Italian helicopter that failed to reach quantity production.

Design
The L.59 was the culmination of work done by Carlo Lualdi throughout the 1950s, and was an enlarged version of his earlier two-seat designs. The L.59 featured four seats accommodated in an extensively glazed cabin. Of conventional pod-and-boom design with skid landing gear, the aircraft had the slightly unusual feature of having its engine mounted in the nose, turning the main rotor by a long driveshaft that reached through the cabin.

Production and operation
Lualdi was able to interest Macchi in the design and two Macchi-built prototypes began flight tests in 1960. Civil certification was achieved in August the following year. Although faultless, the performance of the L.59 was not comparable with that of other helicopters on the market at the time. Macchi planned an initial production batch of 50 machines, but only a single example was sold - one of the prototypes was purchased by the Italian Army for evaluation purposes. No order resulted. The prototype was exhibited at the 1963 Paris Air Show, but again, no orders were obtained for the type.

Surviving aircraft
An Aer Lualdi L.59 wearing the Italian military serial MM576 is preserved in the Centro Polifunziale Ferruccio Lamborghini at Dosso near Ferrara.

Specifications (L.59)

References

 Ogden, Bob. Aviation Museums and Collections of Mainland Europe. 2006. Air-Britain (Historians) ltd. .
 Taylor, John W. R. Jane's All The World's Aircraft 1961–62. London: Sampson Low, Marston & Company, 1961.

1950s Italian helicopters
1950s Italian civil utility aircraft
Single-engined piston helicopters